The IMOCA 60 Class yacht Sceta Calberson 4 was designed by Finot-Conq and launched in the 1994 after being built JMV Industries based in Cherbourg, France.

The hull and deck are made out of per-impregnated T800H carbon fibre sandwich with a Nomex core. The bow region under the waterline is a single skin carbon composite. All of this has been cured at 120°C. The boat has central water ballast and is 2 tonnes lighter than previous generations.

Racing Results

References 

Individual sailing vessels
1990s sailing yachts
Vendée Globe boats
IMOCA 60